Pinillosia is a genus of Caribbean plants in the cosmos tribe within the daisy family.

Species
The only known species is Pinillosia berteroi, native to Cuba (including Isla de la Juventud) and Hispaniola.
formerly included
Pinillosia bellioides - Tetraperone bellioides

References

Coreopsideae
Flora of the Caribbean
Monotypic Asteraceae genera